Das schönste im Leben (The Most Beautiful in Life) is the fourth studio album released by German Schlager group Die Flippers.

Track listing
 "Luana"
 "Desiree"
 "Schöne Carmencita"
 "Hanni Angela"
 "Ich muß sie wiedersehn" (I Must See Her Again)
 "Das schönste im Leben" (The Most Beautiful in Life)
 "Rosemarie"
 "Dann singt die Nichtigall ihr Lied" (Then the Nightingale Sings Her Song)
 "Ich hab' die Liebe gefunden" (I Have Found Love)
 "California"
 "Nie kann Ich vergessen" (I Can Never Forget)
 "Spiel nich mit dem Feuer 2" (Don't Play With the Fire 2)

References

1975 albums
Die Flippers albums
German-language albums